Greg Urbas is a retired head wrestling coach at St. Edward High School in Lakewood, Ohio.

Military career
From 1973–1977, Urbas was an officer in the United States Marine Corps.

Teaching career
While at St. Edwards, Urbas was a math teacher.  He currently serves as a math tutor.

Coaching career
Urbas was head coach at St. Edward for 29 years where he won 24 state titles and 4 national titles.  In 1998, Urbas was named national wrestling coach of the year by the National High School Coaches Association.

Notable athletes coached
Ryan Bertin, 2-time NCAA national champion
Roger Chandler, head coach, Michigan State University wrestling team
Dean Heil, 2-time NCAA national champion
Chris Honeycutt, professional mixed martial artist
Andy Hrovat, 2008 Olympian
Dolph Ziggler, WWE Wrestler
Gray Maynard, former UFC title challenger
Lance Palmer, Professional Fighters League featherweight champion

References

Living people
American wrestling coaches
Year of birth missing (living people)